Molteni is an Italian surname, common also in the Italian diaspora. Some people with the surname include:

 Andrés Molteni, Argentinian tennis player
 Antoine Molteni, Paris based optician and colleague of Daguerre
 François Marie Alfred Molteni, Paris based optician
 Giuseppe Molteni, Italian painter
 Ambrogio Molteni, Italian author
 Benedetta Emilia Agricola-Molteni Italian soprano
 Giorgio Molteni, Italian author
 Luis Molteni, Italian actor
 Marco Molteni, Italian volleyball player
 Westher Molteni, Swiss volleyball player
 Betty Molteni, Italian female long-distance runner

See also 
 Molteni, Italian professional road bicycle racing team

Italian-language surnames